Ravensthorpe railway station serves the Ravensthorpe suburb of Dewsbury in West Yorkshire, England.

The station is managed by Northern Trains, although all services are currently provided by TransPennine Express.

Ravensthorpe station is situated just north-east of Thornhill LNW (London North Western) Junction, where a line branches to Wakefield Kirkgate. There are plans to rebuild the station to the west of the junction, on the route built by the former Manchester and Leeds Railway.

History
Ravensthorpe was a late addition to the London and North Western Railway, with the station and goods shed built in 1890 to attract freight traffic in the area. The line itself had opened some 42 years earlier. Originally, the station was called "Ravensthorpe and Thornhill" as L&Y had opened a station, Ravensthorpe, on their railway branch between Thornhill and Heckmondwike.

Future plans
As part of a wider upgrade to the route between Huddersfield and Dewsbury, Network Rail propose to partially grade separate the junction between the two lines and increase capacity for express trains by 4-tracking the route to the west. The new junction design would move the alignment of the Leeds route slightly to the south, meaning the existing station would have to be largely demolished and rebuilt. A TWAO -Transport Work Act Order was submitted for the 4-tracking in April 2021. The Integrated Rail Plan for the North and Midlands (IRP) announced November 2021, calls for full electrification of the line and thus the station..

Facilities
Ravensthorpe station is unstaffed. The former station buildings, having been damaged by fire, were demolished and replaced with basic shelters. There are no facilities to purchase tickets and so passengers must purchase tickets on the train.

There are timetable posters and a telephone available to obtain train running information, along with digital information screens.  Step-free access is limited to the eastbound platform, as the westbound platform can only be reached by steps.

Ravensthorpe is one of West Yorkshire's least used stations due to its relatively remote location, although it does also serve the nearby village of Thornhill.

Services
Ravensthorpe is served each day (including Sundays) by an hourly TransPennine Express service running between Leeds and Huddersfield.  This replaced the former local Northern-run Leeds to Huddersfield stopping service at the May 2018 timetable change. A limited number of weekday peak Northern services between Leeds and Manchester Victoria via Brighouse also stop here.

See also
 Huddersfield line
 Transpennine north railway upgrade

References

Gallery

External links 

Railway stations in Kirklees
DfT Category F2 stations
Former London and North Western Railway stations
Railway stations in Great Britain opened in 1890
Northern franchise railway stations
Railway stations served by TransPennine Express